FlairJet Limited is an affiliate company of Flexjet and operates the remanufactured Nextant 400XTi. Credited to be the first airline to allow a diabetic pilot to operate aircraft, Gerry Rolls.

Fleet
The airline was founded in 2009 by Chief Executive Officer and former airline pilot David Fletcher and introduced to European operation the Embraer Phenom 100 and 300 business jets.  which is 

Additionally, FlairJet specializes in the acceptance and delivery of Embraer business aircraft and has, up to April 2012, accepted 12 from the Brazilian manufacturer. 

Following an acquisition by Marshall Aerospace, FlairJet was sold to Cleveland, Ohio, based Flexjet, in August 2016.

References

External links
Official website

Airlines established in 2009
Charter airlines of the United Kingdom